Orthophyia longa is a prehistoric proteid salamander from the Miocene of Germany. The only known specimen is now lost.

See also
 List of prehistoric amphibian genera

References

Prehistoric amphibian genera
Miocene amphibians
Proteidae
Neogene amphibians of Europe
Fossil taxa described in 1845